{{DISPLAYTITLE:C30H35NO3}}
The molecular formula C30H35NO3 (molar mass: 457.604 g/mol, exact mass: 457.2617 u) may refer to:

 Levormeloxifene
 Ormeloxifene (or centchroman)

Molecular formulas